The War Against the Rull is a science fiction novel by Canadian-American writer A. E. Van Vogt, first published in 1959 by Simon & Schuster. The novel is a fixup made from six short stories and two connecting chapters.

Component stories
The six short stories that comprise most of the novel,  all originally published in Astounding Science Fiction,  are:

Chapters 1-4: "Co-Operate - Or Else!" (April 1942)
Chapter 5; new material bridging the gap between the first and second stories.
Chapters 6-7: "Repetition" (also known as  "The Gryb": April 1940)
Chapters 8-13: "The Second Solution" (October 1942)
Chapters 14-16: "The Green Forest" (June 1949)
Chapters 17-19: "The Sound" (February 1950)
Chapter 20; new material bridging the gap between the fifth and sixth stories.
Chapters 21-25: "The Rull" (May 1948)

Plot
1-4: Trevor Jamieson is stranded in a deadly jungle on the planet Eristan II with an ezwal, a 3-ton, six-legged saurian-like creature that dislikes humans and wants them to leave his native world, Carson's Planet.  Having bailed out of a crashing spaceship, Jamieson and the telepathic ezwal must make their way to the wreckage in hopes that the subspace radio survived and they can call for help.  Their journey is interrupted by a cruiser belonging to the Rull, creatures that appear to have evolved from chameleon-like worms and who are implacably hostile to all intelligent life.  The Rull capture the ezwal, but must lie hidden when a Terran battleship engages their cruiser.  When a native plant kills the Rull, the ezwal guides Jamieson to their lifeboat and Jamieson flies the two of them to safety.

5: Jamieson arranges to return the ezwal to Carson's Planet.  As they part, the ezwal rejects Jamieson's request that the ezwals develop a mechanical civilization capable of fending off the Rull.  Jamieson finds a similar intransigence in the human settlers, all of whom have had family members killed by ezwals.  One young woman tells him that Carson's Planet's moon is habitable and offers to guide him on tour of it.

6-7: On Carson's Satellite Barbara Whitman leads Jamieson into a trap.  Her plan fails to kill Jamieson, but they are both stranded on a hostile world.  They begin walking back toward the city whence they came and Jamieson uses his wilderness survival skills to obtain food for them and save them from a blood-sucking gryb.  Several days later the crew of his ship finds and rescues them.

8-13: Jamieson had been concerned about a female ezwal and her cub being taken to Earth.  The ship carrying the ezwals crash lands in Alaska and a crewman kills the mother, who kills him before she dies.  The cub manages to escape and is pursued over the landscape by men who believe he is merely an animal.  Jamieson comes as the men are closing in and with the ezwal's cooperation convinces the men that the ezwal is an intelligent being and persuades them not to kill him.

14-16: Jamieson is organizing a project on the planet Mira 23 to obtain a fluid from a native lifeform in order to create a substance that will poison the Rull.  Kidnaped by Rull agents, he is taken to Mira 23, where he will be used to frame the project's leader for his murder.  He is left in the forest, where the lethal fauna will kill him, though the three Rull agents are killed by a menace they did not anticipate.  Jamieson is then rescued by the project's leader.

17-19: In Solar City Jamieson's son Diddy is on a quest to find the source of an all-pervasive sound.  During the all-night quest he is accompanied by Rull spies and saboteurs, who use him to gain access to The Yards, where a giant spaceship is being built.  With the aid of counterspies and the ezwal cub, he obtains a flame gun and kills the saboteurs.  Then he completes his quest.

20: With the ezwal cub accompanying him, Jamieson goes to the planet Ploia to capture one of the natives.  Made up entirely of electromagnetic fields, the Ploian sends electrical systems into a frenzy, so Jamieson must use purely mechanical devices to control his ship.  Through the ezwal's telepathic ability, he makes contact with the Ploian, which agrees to help him in return for a promise to take it home.

21-25: Jamieson has gone directly from Ploia to Laertes III to make a preliminary survey of the planet as a base of operations against the Rull.  A Rull survey boat disables his lifeboat but is itself shot down.  Jamieson must then engage the Rull in a battle of wits for ten days.  In that time he manages to condition the Rull with a subconscious belief that the war is futile.  At the end the Rull captures him, but the Ploian frees him and they go home in a Rull lifeboat.  The Rull Jamieson confronted turns out to have been a Prime Leader and he does, indeed, end the war.

Publication history
1959, USA, Simon & Schuster, Pub date Sep 1959, Hardback (244 pp)
1959, USA, Simon & Schuster Science Fiction Book Club, Pub date Dec 1959, Hardback (192 pp)
1960, Italy, Arnoldo Mondadori Editore (Urania #238), Pub date Sep 1960, Paperback digest (128 pp), as Tutto bene a Carson Planet (All's Well on Carson's Planet)
1961, UK, Panther Books Ltd. (#1168), Pub date Feb 1961 (also Oct 1962), Paperback (156 pp)
1962, USA, Permabooks (#M-4263), Pub date Oct 1962, Paperback (187 pp)
1963, Germany, Heyne Verlag (Heyne Allgemeine Reihe #254), Pub date Oct 1963, Paperback (171 pp), as Der Krieg gegen die Rull (The War Against the Rull)
1963, France, Fleuve Noir (Fleuve Noir - Anticipation #223), Paperback (191 pp), as La guerre contre le Rull (The War Against the Rull)
1963, Spain, E.D.H.A.S.A. (Colección Nebulae #91), Paperback (264 pp), as La guerra contra los Rull (The War Against the Rull)
1965, Brazil, Livros do Brasil (Argonauta #91), Paperback (216 pp), as A Guerra Contra o Rull (The War Against the Rull)
1969, UK, Panther Books Ltd., Pub dates May 1969 (also 1970, Sep 1973, Sep 1975, and Jun 1978), Paperback (156 pp)
1970, USA, Ace Books (#87180), Pub date Feb 1970, Paperback (221 pp)
1970, Italy, Arnoldo Mondadori Editore (Urania #539), Pub date May 1970, Paperback digest (168 pp), as Tutto bene a Carson Planet (All's Well on Carson's Planet)
1972, USA, Ace Books (#871814), Pub date Nov 1972, Paperback (221 pp)
1972, France, J’ai Lu (J’ai Lu - Science Fiction #475), Pub dates 1972 (also Mar 1976, Oct 1978, Feb 1985, Jan 1989, and Mar 1992), Paperback (307 pp), as La guerre contre le Rull (The War Against the Rull)
1976, The Netherlands, Meulenhoff (M=SF #111), Paperback (497 pp), as Oorlog Tegen de Rull (War Against the Rull), along with Maanbeest (Moon Beast) and Het Gestolen Brein (The Stolen Brain)
1977, Italy, Editrice Nord (Cosmo Serie Oro. Classici della Narrativa di Fantascienza #26), Pub date Feb 1977, Hardback (x+228 pp), as La guerra contro i Rull (The War Against the Rull)
1977, USA, Ace Books, Pub date Aug 1977, Paperback (221 pp)
1979, Italy, Arnoldo Mondadori Editore (Millemondi #15), Pub date May 1979, Paperback (139 pp out of 432 pp), as Tutto bene a Carson Planet (All's Well on Carson's Planet), along with La casa senza tempo (The House That Stood Still) and Il cervello trappola (The Mind Cage)

Reviews
The book was reviewed by
Damon Knight at The Magazine of Fantasy and Science Fiction (Jan 1960)
S. E. Cotts at Amazing Science Fiction Stories (Jan 1960)
Frederik Pohl at If (May 1960)
P. Schuyler Miller at Astounding/Analog Science Fact & Fiction (May 1960)
Floyd C. Gale at Galaxy Magazine (Jun 1960)
John T. Phillifent at Vector 11 (Spring 1961)
P. Schuyler Miller at Analog Science Fact - Science Fiction (Jun 1963)
Gérard Klein at Fiction #115 (1963, France)
Charlie Brown at Locus #50 (1970 Mar 19)
Bernard Blanc at Fiction #242 (1974, France)
Lester del Rey at Analog Science Fiction/Science Fact (Jul 1978)
Don Webb at The New York Review of Science Fiction (Nov 1999)
Paul Di Filippo at Asimov's Science Fiction (Aug 2000)

References

Sources
Clute, John. "van Vogt, A E." The Encyclopedia of Science Fiction. Eds. John Clute, David Langford, Peter Nicholls and Graham Sleight. Gollancz, 12 May 2016. Web. 5 Aug. 2016. <http://www.sf-encyclopedia.com/entry/van_vogt_a_e>.
Holdstock, Robert, Ed., Encyclopedia of Science Fiction, London: Cathay Books, Pg. 107, 1978.
Tuck, Donald H. (1974). The Encyclopedia of Science Fiction and Fantasy. Chicago: Advent. pg. 432. .

1959 American novels
1959 science fiction novels
American science fiction novels
Novels set on fictional planets